Association Sportive des Amis de la Fada de Zinder or simply ASAF Zinder is a Nigerien football club based in Zinder, a town approximately 14 hours east of the capital Niamey.  The team competes in the Niger Premier League on past.

External links
Team profile - The Biggest Football Archive of the World

Zinder
Zinder